Bill Alsup (July 15, 1938 in Honolulu – August 9, 2016) was an American race car driver. He was the first Championship Auto Racing Teams (CART) Rookie of the Year in 1979 and competed in the 1981 Indianapolis 500, finishing 11th. He made 57 CART & USAC Champ Car starts in his career. His best race finish of third came 3 times and he was the 1981 CART Championship runner-up, putting in a winless but consistent season for Penske Racing, his only effort with a top-level team. He returned to his own team the next year and struggled until leaving Champ Car following the 1984 Sanair Super Speedway race.

CART career
Alsup made his CART debut at the Arizona Republic/Jimmy Bryan 150 at Phoenix International Raceway driving the #41 WASP Racing Mclaren-Offenhauser for WASP Racing starting twenty fourth (last) and finishing eleventh. He attempted to qualify for the Indianapolis 500, first driving the #67 WASP Racing McLaren-Offenhauser, but the car was not fast enough to make a qualifying run. He then attempted the #19 Sta-On Eagle 74-Offenhauser for Gehlhausen Racing but the engine failed. The final car he attempted to qualify was the #68 CAM 2 Motor Oil Penske PC7-Cosworth DFX for Team Penske. He qualified for the race but USAC officials ruled that the car used the engine from Penske teammate Bobby Unser's car and Alsup was disqualified.
 He drove the remainder of the CART season for WASP Racing. He had a best finish of ninth in the second heat of the Trenton Indy at Trenton Speedway, the Kent Oil 150 at Watkins Glen International, the first heat of the Norton Twin 125s and the Gould Grand Prix, the latter two at Michigan International Speedway, and finished the season fifteenth in points to win the first CART Rookie of the Year Award.

In 1980 Alsup purchased the inventory of WASP Racing and started his own team called Alsup Racing, Alsup driving the #41 Polaroid Time Zero Penske PC7-Cosworth DFX. He started the season by finishing sixth in the season opening Dastun Twin 200 at Ontario Motor Speedway. He failed to qualify for the Indianapolis 500, rebounded to finish third at the Red Roof Inns 150 at Mid-Ohio Sports Car Course, and finished the season seventh in points, earning him the CART Most Improved Driver Award.

In 1981 he drove for Team Penske in a Norton-Spirit sponsored car alongside teammates Bobby Unser and Rick Mears. Driving for Penske in the #7 A.B. Dick Penske PC9B-Cosworth DFX and for himself in the #41 Polaroid Time Zero Penske PC7-Cosworth DFX he had a best finish of third at the Norton Michigan 500 at Michigan International Speedway where he led for three laps. He also finished third at the Los Angeles Times 500 at Riverside International Raceway and at the AB Dick Tony Bettenhausen 200 at Wisconsin State Fairgrounds Park Speedway. He ended the season with a career best second in points in the CART standings but it wasn't enough to keep his ride with TEAM Penske, and he was released from the team at the end of the season.

In 1982 he was back to driving for himself using the #2 A.B. Dick Penske PC9B-Cosworth DFX and had a best finish of fourth at the Stroh's 200 at Atlanta Motor Speedway. He dropped to eleventh in points for the season.

In 1983 he began working with Argo Racing Cars driving the #11 Alsup Racing/Indy Car Annual Argo JM-15-Cosworth DFX. He failed to qualify for the Indianapolis 500 and soon started driving a March 83C-Cosworth DFX. He scored no points that year.

In 1984 he switched between a March 83C-Cosworth DFX and an Argo JM-15-Cosworth DFX. He failed to qualify for the Indianapolis 500 and started his last race at the Molson Indy Montreal at Sanair Super Speedway. He once again failed to score points.

Death 
Alsup died in a crane accident near Silverton, Colorado where he was a long-term resident on August 9, 2016.

Racing record

SCCA National Championship Runoffs

Complete USAC Mini-Indy Series results

Formula Super Vee

SCCA/CART Indy Car Series

References

External links
 

1938 births
2016 deaths
Sportspeople from Honolulu
Racing drivers from Hawaii
Champ Car drivers
Indianapolis 500 drivers
SCCA Formula Super Vee drivers
Formula Super Vee Champions
SCCA National Championship Runoffs participants
People from Silverton, Colorado
Team Penske drivers